This is a list of films produced in Albania during the 1980s.

Films 

  (1980)
  (1980)
  (1980)
  (1980)
  (1980)
  (1980)
  (1980)
  (1980)
  (1980)
  (1980)
  (1980)
  (1980)
  (1980)
  (1981)
  (1981)
  (1981)
  (1981)
  (1981)
  (1981)
  (1981)
  (1981)
  (1981)
  (1981)
  (1981)
  (1981)
  (1981)
  (1981)
  (1982)
  (1982)
  (1982)
  (1982)
  (1982)
  (1982)
  (1982)
  (1983)
  (1983)
  (1983)
  (1983)
  (1983)
  (1983)
  (1983)
  (1983)
  (1984)
  (1984)
  (1984)
  (1984)
  (1984)
  (1984)
  (1984)
  (1984)
  (1984)
  (1984)
  (1984)
  (1984)
  (1984)
  (1985)
  (1985)
  (1985)
  (1985)
  (1985)
  (1985)
  (1985)
  (1985)
  (1985)
  (1985)
  (1985)
  (1985)
  (1985)
  (1985)
  (1986)
  (1986)
  (1986)
  (1986)
  (1986)
  (1986)
  (1986)
  (1986)
  (1986)
  (1986)
  (1986)
  (1986)
  (1986)
  (1987)
  (1987)
  (1987)
  (1987)
  (1987)
  (1987)
  (1987)
  (1987)
  (1987)
  (1987)
  (1987)
  (1987)
  (1987)
  (1987)
  (1987)
  (1988)
  (1988)
  (1988)
  (1988)
  (1988)
  (1988)
  (1988)
  (1988)
  (1988)
  (1988)
  (1988)
  (1988)
  (1988)
  (1989)
  (1989)
  (1989)
  (1989)
  (1989)
  (1989)
  (1989)
  (1989)
  (1989)
  (1989)
  (1989)
  (1989)

References 

Lists of Albanian films